Pune Ring Road is a road planned for construction in and around the city of Pune, India. Pune Metropolitan Region Development Authority claimed that the road will decrease traffic congestion and provide better access to the fastest growing areas. The road will be 128 km long and will service twenty-nine villages by connecting all highways around the city.

The Pimpri-Chinchwad Municipal Corporation, Pune Municipal Corporation and Pune Metropolitan Region Development Authority are responsible for the road plan and purchase of the required land. The Public Works Department suggested that the Design-Finance-Build-Operate-Transfer model be used.

Details
The ring road will be 105 km long when completed. The road will consist of 2 lanes on both sides, and will include 8 flyovers, 4 bridges over railways, 7 viaducts, 14 subway roads, 13 tunnels (with a total subterranean distance of 3.75 km), and will cost an estimated ₹104.08 billion (US$1.5bn). The total land used for the project will be 48 hectares (118.6 acres) of government-owned land, and 25 hectares (61.8 acres) of privately owned land.

Planning

This project will be completed in four phases:

 Phase 1: Theurphata - NH 65 - Kesnand - Wagholi - Charholi - Bhavdi - Tulapur - Alandi - Kelgaon - Chimbli - NH 60
 Phase 2: NH 60 - Chimbli Moi - Nighoje - Sangurde - Shelarwadi - Chandkhed - Pachne - Pimploli - Rihe - Ghotawde - Pirangutphata
 Phase 3: Pirangutphata - Bhugaon - Chandni Chowk - Ambegaon - Katraj
 Phase 4: Ambegaon - Katraj - Mangdewadi - Wadachiwadi - Holkarwadi - Wadkinaka - Ramdara - Theurphata - NH 65

History
On 12 July 2007, Maharashtra Chief Minister Sri Vilasrao Deshmukh proposed a ring road around city of Pune. The Pune District Guardian Minister proposed that the road be 120 meters wide with service roads.

On 16 January 2014, the Government of Maharashtra approved the Maharashtra State Road Development Corporation's proposal for preparing a detailed project report.

The government announced the formation of the authority on 2 April 2015. The authority prioritizes Metro and Ring Road works and promises to turn these plans into reality. On 26 July 2015, Pune NCP leader Ajit Pawar described irregularities in the detailed project report. The Maharashtra Chief Minister Devendra Fadnavis announced a new survey, and the work was given to the authority. On 7 November 2015, authority completed the land survey. Maharashtra State Road Development Corporation planned to take measures to commence construction.

On 8 November 2019, Times of India reported that according to the Pune Metropolitan Region Development Authority, only 24% of the needed land had been used for the first phase and "officials are awaiting central funds to speed up the project."

See also

 List of roads in Pune

References

External links
 Ring Road (Pune) Presentation
The Pune Metropolitan Region Development Authority
 Now, Urban development department to focus on traffic, transport woes
 Consultants for Ring Road in Pune

Transport in Pimpri-Chinchwad
Transport in Pune
Ring roads in India
Proposed roads in India
Proposed infrastructure in Maharashtra